Myelois pluripunctella is a species of snout moth. It is found in Greece and Lebanon.

The wingspan is about 27 mm.

References

Moths described in 1887
Phycitini
Moths of Europe